Golma Devi Meena is a member of the 14th Rajasthan Legislative Assembly. She represents the Rajgarh Laxmangarh constituency of Alwar district in the Indian state of Rajasthan. In the 2013 state assembly elections, she defeated Surajbhan Dhanka of the Samajwadi Party with a margin of 8,128 votes.
She was an independent candidate in 2008 Rajasthan Legislative Assembly election from Mahwa and minister of state for Khadi and village industries in the government headed by Ashok Gehlot in 2009 but quit the post after four months. She left the party because in her opinion its leaders in the state repeatedly humiliated her husband, Kirodi Lal Meena. Kirodi himself is a former Bharatiya Janata Party politician who was a cabinet minister holding the portfolio of food and civil supplies. , he is a member of National People's Party..
She was a BJP candidate from Sapotara in the 2018 Rajasthan Legislative Assembly election, but she was defeated by Ramesh Chand Meena of the Indian National Congress.

References

People from Sawai Madhopur district
Living people
Rajasthan MLAs 2013–2018
National People's Party (India) politicians
State cabinet ministers of Rajasthan
Indian National Congress politicians
1949 births
Bharatiya Janata Party politicians from Rajasthan